The following lists events that happened during 1973 in Greece.

Incumbents
Monarch: Constantine II (until 1 June)
President: Georgios Papadopoulos (1 June to 25 November), Phaedon Gizikis (starting 25 November)
Regent: Georgios Papadopoulos (until 31 May)
Prime Minister: Georgios Papadopoulos (until 8 October), Spyros Markezinis (8 October to 25 November), Adamantios Androutsopoulos (starting 25 November)

Events
July 29: Republic referendum held. Abolition of monarchy confirmed.
November 14–17: Athens Polytechnic uprising against the military junta governing the country. The uprising ended in a bloodshed after the intervention of the military.

References

External links

 
Years of the 20th century in Greece
Greece
Greece
1970s in Greece